Yves Massard (1923–1996) was a German-born French film actor.

Filmography

References

Bibliography
 Labanyi, Jo & Pavlović, Tatjana. A Companion to Spanish Cinema. John Wiley & Sons, 2012.

External links

1923 births
1996 deaths
French male stage actors
French male film actors
People from Saarbrücken
German emigrants to France